Eupithecia memorata is a moth in the family Geometridae. It is found in the Russian Far East.

References

Moths described in 1988
memorata
Moths of Asia